The Andres O. Ness House at Oak Ave. and 6th St. in Hatton, North Dakota  was listed on the National Register of Historic Places in 1977.  The listing included three contributing buildings: the house, a carriage house, and a privy.

It was the former home of Andres O. Ness (1850–1913), who was born in Nes, Hallingdal, Norway.
In 1884 he married Ragnhild Enrud (1852-1921) and in 1900 purchased a lot in the townsite of Hatton.
Their residence was built circa 1908.

The house is now known as the Hatton Eielson Museum. Hatton Eielson Museum and Historical Association was formed in 1973. Exhibits include memorabilia of Colonel Carl Benjamin Eielson (1897-1929). The museum also features displays on members of the Eielson family, the city of Hatton and surrounding area.

References

External links
 Hatton Eielson Museum  official website

Houses on the National Register of Historic Places in North Dakota
Houses completed in 1908
Museums in Traill County, North Dakota
History museums in North Dakota
Norwegian-American culture in North Dakota
Houses in Traill County, North Dakota
National Register of Historic Places in Traill County, North Dakota
1908 establishments in North Dakota